The Tibet Action Institute is an organization that uses digital communication tools and strategic nonviolent action to strengthen the capacity and effectiveness of the Tibet movement in the digital era, founded by Lhadon Tethong in 2009. The organization helps to identify, trace, and resist malware and other online attacks launched against Tibetan activists.

History

In 2012, Lhadon Tethong, director of the Tibet Action Institute, explained self-immolations in Tibet as a response to escalating repression from the Chinese government.

In 2013, Citizen Lab collaborated with the Tibet Action Institute to hold public awareness events in Dharamshala, India, for the exiled Tibetan community on cyber espionage campaigns.

In 2018, Lhadon Tethong said there was a "crisis of repression unfolding across China and territories it controls." and that "it is shocking to know that Google is planning to return to China and has been building a tool that will help the Chinese authorities engage in censorship and surveillance." She further noted that, "Google should be using its incredible wealth, talent, and resources to work with us to find solutions to lift people up and help ease their suffering — not assisting the Chinese government to keep people in chains."

In 2019, the group received the Democracy Award.

References

External links
 Tibet Action Institute 

Tibet
Tibetan independence movement
Human rights organizations